Joel Zakarias Kabongo (born 5 April 1998) is a Danish former professional footballer who played as a centre-back.

Club career

Early career
Kabongo started playing for hometown club Albertslund IF before signing a youth contract with Brøndby IF. During his time in the youth teams, Kabongo was a part of the under-17 team that won the championship and the domestic cup. On 31 August 2017, Kabongo moved to second division club Fremad Amager on loan until 1 January 2018. He made his first-team debut for Fremad on 3 September, coming on as a substitute for Heini Vatnsdal in the 82nd minute of a 1–0 win home win against Esbjerg fB.

Brøndby
After returning to Brøndby from his loan spell, Kabongo saw playing time in the team's pre-season friendlies, being in the starting lineup in a match against Shakhtar Donetsk. Kabongo made his official debut for Brøndby in the first match of the 2018–19 Danish Superliga season, starting in a 2–0 away win over Randers FC and playing the entire match.

On 16 August 2018, Kabongo made his UEFA Europa League debut, starting in a 2–1 home win over Spartak Subotica. His debut was short-lived, however, as he was sent off in the 15th minute for a professional foul on Dejan Đenić. On 26 August 2018, in a 2–1 win over Vendsyssel FF, Kabongo was sent off again, this time for a 92nd minute foul on Sander Fischer, resulting in a penalty and Kabongo being shown a second yellow card. On 22 April 2019, in a match against FC Midtjylland, Kabongo suffered a cruciate ligament tear and was substituted in the first half. The initial prognosis suggested that he would miss 12 months.

On 5 March 2020, Kabongo, alongside several other Brøndby personnel, was placed in home quarantine after having met with former Brøndby-player Thomas Kahlenberg, who had tested positive for SARS-CoV-2 in the early stages of the COVID-19 pandemic in Denmark. Kahlenberg had been infected at a birthday party in Amsterdam, the Netherlands. Kabongo made his comeback in football on 21 May 2020 in a friendly against Lyngby.

Randers
On 27 July 2021 it was confirmed, that Kabongo had left Brøndby to join fellow league club Randers FC on a three-year deal. He made his debut for the club on 8 August, coming on as a substitute for Frederik Lauenborg in the 88th minute in a 1–0 win. On 28 August, he was injured again and was initially sidelined for the match against Silkeborg on the same day. On 1 October, Kabongo announced via his Instagram account that he had suffered a more serious knee injury which had required surgery.

On 1 August 2022, Randers FC announced that Kabongo had retired, aged 24, after failing to recover from a long-term knee injury originally sustained in a league match for Brøndby against Midtjylland in April 2019.

Personal life 
Kabongo and his girlfriend, Melanie Litgov, have one daughter, Veneda (born 30 April 2020 at Rigshospitalet).

Career statistics

Honours
Brøndby IF
 Danish Superliga: 2020–21
 Danish Cup: 2017–18

References

External links
 Joel Kabongo profile at the Danish Football Association website
 Joel Kabongo at Soccerbase

1998 births
Living people
Danish people of Zambian descent
Danish men's footballers
Denmark under-21 international footballers
Denmark youth international footballers
Association football defenders
Brøndby IF players
Fremad Amager players
Randers FC players
Danish Superliga players
Danish 1st Division players
People from Albertslund Municipality
Sportspeople from the Capital Region of Denmark